Do or Die is the first studio album by the American thrash metal band Viking. It was released on February 1, 1988 through Metal Blade Records and executive produced by the label's founder Brian Slagel. There has never been an official CD release of this album, although bootleg copies have been available.

Track listing

Personnel
Viking
 Ron Eriksen - vocals, guitar
 Brett Eriksen - guitar
 James Lareau - bass
 Matt Jordan - drums

Production
Jerry Adamowicz - engineer
Brian Slagel - executive producer

References

1988 debut albums
Metal Blade Records albums
Viking (band) albums